Gabrielle Fontan (16 April 1873 – 8 September 1959) was a French film actress. She appeared in more than 120 films between 1927 and 1959.

Selected filmography

 Misdeal (1928)
 The Crime of Sylvestre Bonnard (1929)
 The Ladies in the Green Hats (1929)
 The Lighthouse Keepers (1929)
 My Friend Victor (1931)
 Toto (1933)
 Gold in the Street (1934)
 Partie de campagne (1936)
 Life Dances On (1937)
 The Ladies in the Green Hats (1937)
 The Little Thing (1938)
 Ramuntcho (1938)
  The Time of the Cherries (1938)
 The Fatted Calf (1939)
 First Ball (1941)
 The Stairs Without End (1943)
 Mademoiselle Béatrice (1943)
 Strange Inheritance (1943)
 Love Story (1943)
 Night Shift (1944)
 Majestic Hotel Cellars (1945)
 François Villon (1945)
 Her Final Role (1946)
 Sylvie and the Ghost (1946)
 Jericho (1946)
 The Last Penny (1946)
 Night Express (1948)
 After Love (1948)
 Une si jolie petite plage (1949)
 Vertigine d'amore (1949)
 Julie de Carneilhan (1950)
 Quay of Grenelle (1950)
 Juliette, or Key of Dreams (1951)
 Two Pennies Worth of Violets (1951)
 Flesh and the Woman (1954)
 Les hommes ne pensent qu'à ça (1954)
 Black Dossier (1955)
 Voici le temps des assassins (1956)
 Love Is at Stake (1957)
 A Certain Monsieur Jo (1958)
 First of May (1958)
Julie the Redhead (1959)

References

External links

1873 births
1959 deaths
French film actresses
French silent film actresses
Deaths from cancer in France
20th-century French actresses